Donna Benjamin is an Australian open source community contributor, commentator and advocate. She has served in board positions with community organisations including Open Source Industry Australia, Drupal Association and the Ada Initiative, and was the lead organiser of the 2008 linux.conf.au conference in Melbourne. She regularly runs the Community Leadership Summit X at LCA (clsXlca), a workshop focussing on community development in open source projects. In 2011 she organised a crowdfunding campaign called Digitise The Dawn, which successfully raised funds to digitise The Dawn, an early feminist journal published in Australia between 1888 and 1905.

In 2012 she received the Rusty Wrench Award from Linux Australia in recognition of her contributions. She runs a micro-business called Creative Contingencies, which specialises in the Drupal content management platform.

References

External links

 Donna Benjamin's blog
 Creative Contingencies
 Digitise the Dawn campaign site

Linux people
Living people
Year of birth missing (living people)